Patty Schnyder was the defending champion, but lost in quarterfinals to Arantxa Sánchez Vicario.

Silvija Talaja won the title by defeating Conchita Martínez 6–0, 0–6, 6–4 in the final.

Seeds
The top two seeds received a bye into the second round.

Draw

Finals

Top half

Bottom half

References

External links
 Main draw (WTA)
 ITF tournament edition details

Thalgo
2000 Thalgo Australian Women's Hardcourts